Rotariu is a Romanian surname stemming from the word rotar, which means wheelwright. It that may refer to
Dorin Rotariu (born 1995), Romanian football player
Iosif Rotariu (born 1962), Romanian football midfielder, uncle of Dorin
Ela Rotariu (born 1998), Romanian poetry author

See also
Rotaru

Romanian-language surnames